Ofenbach is a French DJ duo founded in 2014, consisting of Dorian Lauduique and César de Rummel and based in Paris. Their gold-certified song "Be Mine" charted on the Billboard Dance/Mix Show Airplay reached number 35. After releasing songs like "Around the Fire" and "You Don't Know Me", they gained support from artists such as Robin Schulz and Tiësto. They are also known for remixing songs from Bob Sinclar, Hyphen Hyphen, and James Bay.

History 

The duo met at school at an early age. When they were 13 years old, Lo's father told them that one of the best experiences of his life was being part of a band. This inspired them to form their first musical group in which they performed rock music. They cite some of their influences as Supertramp, The Rolling Stones, and Led Zeppelin.

The name Ofenbach was selected after the duo found a score by French composer Jacques Offenbach at their home.

Ofenbach released their single "Be Mine" alongside an official remix package via Warner Music France/Big Beat, which featured remixes from Agrume, Antiyu, and Stone Van Brooken. The song peaked at number one in Russia and Poland.

Discography

Studio albums

Extended plays

Singles

Remixes 

2014
 Miriam Makeba – "Pata Pata" 
 Andreas Moe – "Under the Sun" 
 James Bay – "Hold Back the River" 

2015
 Lily & Madeleine – "Come to Me" 

2016
 Shem Thomas – "We Just Need a Little" 

2017
 James Blunt – "Love Me Better" 
 Portugal. The Man – "Feel It Still" 
 Rudimental featuring James Arthur – "Sun Comes Up" 

2018
 Clean Bandit featuring Demi Lovato – "Solo" 

2020
 Robin Schulz featuring Kiddo – "All We Got" 

2021
 Faouzia and John Legend – "Minefields" 
 Years & Years – "Starstruck" 
 Ed Sheeran – "Shivers" 
 Ofenbach and Ella Henderson – "Hurricane"

References

External links
 

French DJs
Living people
French electronic music groups
Deep house musicians
French musical duos
Musical groups from Paris
Electronic dance music DJs
Year of birth missing (living people)